The following is the qualification system and summary of the sailing at the 2023 Pan American Games competition.

Qualification system
A total of 172 sailors (82 men and 90 women) will qualify to compete at the games. A nation may enter a maximum of one boat in each of the 13 events and a maximum of 19 athletes (nine men and ten women). Each event had different qualifying events that began in 2021. The host nation (Chile) automatically qualified in all 13 events (19 athletes). More women will qualify to compete for the first time ever, after the lightning class switched to a two women and one man format for each boat. The winner of each sailing event at the 2021 Junior Pan American Games, directly qualified as well. Countries earning a spot at the 2021 Junior Pan American Games, can earn another boat in that respective event. The slot awarded at the games is to the athlete, and cannot be transferred to another athlete. A total of four universality quotas were available (two each in the laser and laser radial events).

Qualification summary

Qualified boats

IQFoil men

Laser men

49er men

Sunfish men

Kites men

IQFoil women

Laser radial women

49er FX women

Sunfish women

Kites women

Snipe mixed

Lightning mixed

Nacra 17 mixed

References

P
P
P
Qualification for the 2023 Pan American Games
Sailing at the 2023 Pan American Games